Stadionul Crișul is a multi-purpose stadium in Chișineu-Criș, Romania. It is currently used mostly for football matches and is the home ground of Crișul Chișineu-Criș. The stadium holds 2,000 people and between 2012 and 2014 was renovated and upgraded, now having a new covered stand with 500 places on seats.

References

Football venues in Romania
Buildings and structures in Arad County